The 1937 Cleveland Indians season was a season in American baseball. The team finished fourth in the American League with a record of 83–71, 19 games behind the New York Yankees.

Regular season 
 April 20, 1937: Gee Walker of the Detroit Tigers' became the first (and to date only) man to hit for the cycle on Opening Day. Walker did it in reverse order (home run, triple, double, single) to lead the Tigers past the Indians 4–3 on April 20, 1937.

Season standings

Record vs. opponents

Roster

Player stats

Batting

Starters by position 
Note: Pos = Position; G = Games played; AB = At bats; H = Hits; Avg. = Batting average; HR = Home runs; RBI = Runs batted in

Other batters 
Note: G = Games played; AB = At bats; H = Hits; Avg. = Batting average; HR = Home runs; RBI = Runs batted in

Pitching

Starting pitchers 
Note: G = Games pitched; IP = Innings pitched; W = Wins; L = Losses; ERA = Earned run average; SO = Strikeouts

Other pitchers 
Note: G = Games pitched; IP = Innings pitched; W = Wins; L = Losses; ERA = Earned run average; SO = Strikeouts

Relief pitchers 
Note: G = Games pitched; W = Wins; L = Losses; SV = Saves; ERA = Earned run average; SO = Strikeouts

Awards and honors 
All Star Game

Earl Averill, outfielder (starter)

Mel Harder, pitcher

Farm system

References

External links
1937 Cleveland Indians season at Baseball Reference

Cleveland Indians seasons
Cleveland Indians season
Cleveland Indians